Hsieh Su-wei was the defending champion but decided not to participate.

Erika Sema won the tournament, defeating Mai Minokoshi in the final, 6–1, 7–5.

Seeds

Draw

Finals

Top half

Bottom half

References 
 Main draw

Samsung Securities Cup - Women's Singles
2012 Women's Singles